"She Can Put Her Shoes Under My Bed (Anytime)" is a song written by Aaron Schroeder and Bob Halley, and recorded by American country music artist Johnny Duncan.  It was released in February 1978 as the first single from the album The Best Is Yet to Come.  "She Can Put Her Shoes Under My Bed (Anytime)" was the third and final number one on the country chart for Johnny Duncan.  The single stayed at number one for one week and spent a total of ten weeks on the country chart.

Chart performance

References
 

1978 singles
Johnny Duncan (country singer) songs
Songs written by Aaron Schroeder
Song recordings produced by Billy Sherrill
Columbia Records singles
1978 songs